Halo is a 1996 Indian drama film directed by Santosh Sivan. It tells the story of how the loneliness in Sasha, a  seven-year-old girl's life is filled by her puppy Halo. When Halo gets lost, Sasha aims to find him at any cost. Sasha's search for her puppy on the Byzantine streets of Mumbai leads her down a rabbit hole as she encounters one idiosyncratic person after another.

Plot
The film starts with the school's nun-teacher (Mehr Vakil) being frustrated at the ringing of the school bell, which indicates the end of school and the start of summer vacation. The story then turns to Sasha (Benaf Dadachandji), a motherless child who yearns of a mother's love despite having Mr. Deshpande (Rajkumar Santoshi), her doting father who works as a criminal lawyer. Her friend Thomas (Kavin Dave) has gone to London to undergo a surgery.

During vacation, while all the other kids are busy playing, Sasha sits silently, not eating. So, a servant fabricates a story that a miracle will happen in form of a halo. A street dog comes along and Sasha believes it to be the miracle, the God-sent halo. She adopts it and names it Halo. Sasha's life now revolves around the dog. She sleeps, drinks, and eats with him. Her father doesn't object, even though he doesn't like dogs. Her father, through a Satyavadi and following the principles of Gandhiji, observes a fast. One day, Halo goes missing, and Sasha searches inside and outside for him but to no avail.

She first asks the police commissioner (Mukesh Rishi) who uses her for his own plan to capture a gang of notorious smugglers led by Smuggler Raja (Tinu Anand). However, the credit for capturing the smugglers goes to Sasha. She also gets help from Ranga (Wasim Khan), a leader of a group of street urchins.

Eventually, she finds Halo under the care of an old couple (Dr. B. M. Banerji and Mrs. Banerji) with their physically disabled grandson Abdul (Yazad Mohedji).

At the end of the movie, Sasha happily gives the dog to Abdul.

Cast

Benaf Dadachandji as Sasha Deshpande
Bulang Raja as Anil
Rajkumar Santoshi as Advocate Deshpande, Sasha's father
Pooja Punjabi as Mamta
Mukesh Rishi as Police Commissioner
Tinu Anand as Smuggler Raja
Harish Patel as Astrologer
Mehr Vakil as Nun
Dolly Chainani as Girl 1
Tamana Gulrajani as Girl 2
Vinita Chainani as Girl 3
Supriya Pathak as Mother
Chintu Mahapatra as Chintu
Dimple Ghosh as Lata
Mr. Punjabi as Doctor
Poocha as Tiger
Kavin Dave as Thomas
Marukh Dadachandji as Thomas's mother
Sahil as TV Host of BadBad talk show
Anamika Ghosh as Videographer
Dipankar as Prabhu Deva
Goldie Singh as Goldie
Ajit as Tabla Player
Ashok Narayan as Mr. Pappu, the 99-year-old man
Halo as Halo
Farookh Dadachandji as Veterinarian
Bala (Nandlal) as Newspaper Editor
Prakash Mahapatra as Assistant Newspaper Editor
Sagar as Photographer
Kanika Nandlal as Secretary
Suhas Gujrathi as Office Boy
Suresh Bhagwat as Dog Catcher
Vijay Khote as Constable 1
Anand as Constable 2
Ajay as Constable 3
Snehendra as Constable 4
Abdulkayyam as Journalist
Anil Sharma as Smuggler 1
Javed Khan as Washer Boy
Babu as Ranga's Assistant
Wasim Khan as Ranga
Dr. B. M. Banerji as Old Man
Mrs. Banerji as Old Woman
Yazad Mohedji as Abdul
Sajana Sivam as Kid in Riots

Awards
1996: National Film Award for Best Children's Film
1996: National Film Award – Special Jury Award / Special Mention (Feature Film)  – Benaf Dadachandji
2001: Filmfare Award for Best Film (Critics)

Public viewing
Halo was first released on Children's Day in 1996 on Doordarshan.

References

External links

Official website from the Children's Film Society, India 

Indian Film Festival of Los Angeles
Rediff article on Halo

1996 films
Indian children's films
1990s Hindi-language films
Best Children's Film National Film Award winners
Films that won the Best Audiography National Film Award
Films about dogs
Films directed by Santosh Sivan
Films about pets